Emilee Klein (born June 11, 1974) is an American professional golfer and college golf coach who played on the LPGA Tour.

Klein was born in Santa Monica, California and grew up in Sherman Oaks, California, where she attended Notre Dame High School. She had a successful amateur career winning several tournaments including the 1991 U.S. Girls' Junior. She played college golf at Arizona State University and won the 1994 NCAA Division I Championship as well as being on the winning team in 1993 and 1994. She was a member of the U.S. Curtis Cup team in 1994.

Klein qualified for the LPGA Tour in the LPGA Final Qualifying Tournament in 1994. She won three times on the LPGA Tour between 1996 and 2001. She was a member of the 2002 Solheim Cup team.

After retiring from the LPGA Tour, Klein has been head golf coach at University of Central Florida (2005–2009), San Diego State University (2009–2011), and University of Tulsa (2014–present). Klein resigned from her position as head golf coach at San Diego State University in May 2011 to begin a career in the insurance industry. Klein became an insurance agent for State Farms Insurance in Beverly Hills, California, in June 2011. She was announced as the women's golf head coach at University of Tulsa on June 20, 2014.

Amateur wins
1988 California Women's Amateur
1991 U.S. Girls' Junior
1993 Broadmoor Invitational, North and South Amateur
1994 NCAA Division I Championship

Professional wins

LPGA Tour (3)

Note: Klein won the Weetabix Women's British Open before it became a major championship.

LPGA Tour playoff record (0–2)

Ladies European Tour (1)
1996 (1) Weetabix Women's British Open (co-sanctioned by the LPGA Tour)

Team appearances
Amateur
Curtis Cup (representing the United States): 1994 (tie)

Professional
Solheim Cup (representing the United States): 2002 (winners)

References

External links

American female golfers
Arizona State Sun Devils women's golfers
LPGA Tour golfers
Solheim Cup competitors for the United States
College golf coaches in the United States
Golfers from Santa Monica, California
American women academics
University of Central Florida faculty
San Diego State University faculty
1974 births
Living people